Asclepiodotus was a Greek physician, mathematician, and musician of the late 5th century AD, who was best known for promoting the medicinal uses of white hellebore. He was a pupil of Jacobus Psychrestus, and is mentioned by Damascius.

References

5th-century Byzantine physicians
5th-century Byzantine writers
5th-century Greek physicians